Robert W. Rosenthal (1945 – February 7, 2002) was an American economist, most known for his contributions to game theory.

He obtained a B.A. in political economy from Johns Hopkins University (1966),
M.S.  (1968) and
Ph.D. (1971) in operations research from Stanford University,
advised by Robert B. Wilson.
He worked as assistant professor in the department of Industrial Engineering and
management science at
Northwestern University (1970–76), was member of the technical staff at
Bell Labs (1976–83),
was professor of economics at
Virginia Polytechnic Institute and State University (1983–84),
State University of New York at Stony Brook (1984–87) and
Boston University where he worked (1987–2002) until his death from a heart attack.  He also
had appointments with Massachusetts Institute of Technology (2000), Harvard University (1993), and Catholic University of Louvain (1973).
He held a Fulbright chair in economics at University of Siena (2001).

He authored many journal articles, and defined the revelation principle and random matching, as applied in works
with Henry Landau.    Also, he was associate editor of Games and Economic Behavior (1988–2002), Journal of Economic Theory (1999–2002),
Mathematics of Operations Research (1981–88) and Operations Research: A Journal of the Institute for Operations Research and the Management Sciences (1978–82).

See also
Mean-field game theory

References

External links

20th-century American economists
Johns Hopkins University alumni
Stanford University alumni
Northwestern University faculty
Scientists at Bell Labs
Virginia Tech faculty
Stony Brook University faculty
Boston University faculty
Harvard University staff
Academic staff of the University of Siena
Game theorists
1945 births
2002 deaths
Academic staff of the Université catholique de Louvain
Fellows of the Econometric Society